The Dnieper Rapids also known as Cataracts of the Dnieper are the historical rapids on the Dnieper river in Ukraine, composed of outcrops of granites, gneisses and other types of bedrock of the Ukrainian Shield. The rapids began below the present-day city of Dnipro (formerly Kodak Fortress, Yekaterinoslav), where the river turns to the south, and dropped 50 meters in 66 kilometers, ending before the present-day city of Zaporizhzhia (whose name literally means "beyond the rapids"). 

There were nine major rapids (some sources give a smaller number), about 30–40 smaller rapids and 60 islands and islets. The rapids almost totally obstructed navigation of the river.

After the Dnieper Hydroelectric Station was built at Zaporizhzhia in 1932, the rapids were inundated by the Dnieper Reservoir.

Historical mentions

The Dnieper Rapids were part of the trade route from the Varangians to the Greeks first mentioned in the Primary Chronicle. The route was probably established in the late eighth and early ninth centuries and gained significant importance from the tenth until the first third of the eleventh century. On the Dnieper the travelers had to portage their ships round seven rapids, where they had to be on guard for Pecheneg nomads.

The rapids was mentioned in Emperor Constantine VII's work De Administrando Imperio and in The Tale of Igor's Campaign.

Names of the major rapids
In Ukrainian tradition, there were 9 major rapids (given in the direction of the river flow as shown in the picture on the right): 
 . The Kodak Fortress formerly stood near this rapid.
 . Almost all the rocks of this rapid were submerged in shallow water.
  
  
 , or Nenasytets or Revuchyi, the biggest and most dangerous of the rapids, called Peklo by the locals, 2.4 km long and over 1 km wide. Its roaring could be heard several kilometers away.
  
  
 . This name is most likely because it was the least dangerous, posing almost no problems for navigation.
  
Names given in transcription from the Ukrainian language.

Correspondence of some of the names from different historical sources is seen in the table below:

References

External links
 Leo Bagrow. "The First Maps of the Dnieper Cataracts". (in English)
 Dnipro Rapids. Encyclopedia of Ukraine (in English)

Dnieper
Former bodies of water
Geography of Dnipropetrovsk Oblast
Geography of Zaporizhzhia Oblast
History of Dnipropetrovsk Oblast
History of Zaporizhzhia Oblast
Rapids
Rivers of Ukraine
Varangians